Łączki may refer to the following places:
Łączki, Kuyavian-Pomeranian Voivodeship (north-central Poland)
Łączki, Lesko County in Subcarpathian Voivodeship (south-east Poland)
Łączki, Przemyśl County in Subcarpathian Voivodeship (south-east Poland)
Łączki, Masovian Voivodeship (east-central Poland)
Łączki, Silesian Voivodeship (south Poland)
Łączki, Pomeranian Voivodeship (north Poland)
Łączki, Warmian-Masurian Voivodeship (north Poland)